Peter Muller is a former professional Canadian football player. He played as a tight end for the Toronto Argonauts of the Canadian Football League from 1973 to 1981.

One of the great Argo tight ends, he played 9 years and 126 regular season games (and two playoff games!)  He led the team in receiving in 1974, '77 and '78. Muller was also an innovator as he was one of the first openly Christian athletes. After his football days he was Vice-Principal at Queensway Christian College in Mississauga, and used to work in Calgary, Alberta as the Principal at Master's College, an innovative Christian school focussing on educating kids to be meaningful members of todays culture.

In 1978, he won the Tom Pate Memorial Award for outstanding sportsmanship and dedication to his community.

References

Toronto Argonauts players
Living people
1951 births
Western Illinois Leathernecks football players